Octavio Bartolucci (born 8 March 1975, in Rosario) is an Argentine rugby union footballer. He plays as a wing.

He played for Club Atlético del Rosario, from 1993/94 to 1999/2000, in Argentina. He moved afterwards to SU Agen (2000/01), in France, and to Leeds Carnegie (2001/02), in England. He returned to Club Atlético del Rosario, where he played the rest of his career, from 2001/02 to 2008/09.

Bartolucci had 20 caps for Argentina, scoring 9 tries, 45 points in aggregate, from 1996 to 2003. He participated at the 1999 Rugby World Cup finals, playing in two matches. He won the South American Rugby Championship in 1998 and 2003. He missed the 2003 Rugby World Cup because of an injury on the Achilles heel.

References

External links
Octavio Bartolucci International Statistics

1975 births
Living people
Sportspeople from Rosario, Santa Fe
Argentine rugby union players
Rugby union wings
Argentina international rugby union players
Club Atlético del Rosario rugby union players
Argentine expatriate rugby union players
Expatriate rugby union players in France
Expatriate rugby union players in England
Argentine expatriate sportspeople in France
Argentine expatriate sportspeople in England